The St. Paul Minnesota Temple is the 69th operating temple of the Church of Jesus Christ of Latter-day Saints (LDS Church).  It is located in Oakdale, Minnesota, United States, a suburb of St. Paul, Minnesota, and is the first temple of the LDS Church to be built in the state.

The site of the St. Paul Minnesota Temple is also the site of a stake center, a larger meetinghouse for the members of the LDS Church. The temple is situated on a wooded  site.  The building itself features a single spire and is covered with a light gray granite veneer.

History
The temple was announced in August of 1998. A groundbreaking was held on groundbreaking held on September 26, 1998. Construction continued over the following year, as the Angel Moroni statue atop the temple was hoisted into place on September 25, 1999. LDS Church president Gordon B. Hinckley dedicated the St. Paul Minnesota Temple on January 9, 2000.

The temple received minor damage on September 10, 2008 in a fire that inspectors believe was arson.

In 2020, the St. Paul Minnesota Temple was closed in response to the coronavirus pandemic.

See also

 Comparison of temples of The Church of Jesus Christ of Latter-day Saints
 List of temples of The Church of Jesus Christ of Latter-day Saints
 List of temples of The Church of Jesus Christ of Latter-day Saints by geographic region
 Temple architecture (Latter-day Saints)

Additional reading

References

External links
St. Paul Minnesota Temple Official site
St. Paul Minnesota Temple at ChurchofJesusChristTemples.org

20th-century Latter Day Saint temples
2000 establishments in Minnesota
Buildings and structures in Washington County, Minnesota
Religious buildings and structures in Minnesota
Temples (LDS Church) completed in 2000
Temples (LDS Church) in the United States